Taraz Kuh (also Romanized as Ţarāz Kūh and Taraz Kooh; also known as Tarazku) is a village in Pasikhan Rural District, in the Central District of Rasht County, Gilan Province, Iran. At the 2006 census, its population was 793, in 205 families.

References 

Populated places in Rasht County